The 2022 Greater Sudbury municipal election was held on October 24, 2022 to elect a mayor and 12 city councillors in Greater Sudbury, Ontario. In addition, school trustees were elected to the Rainbow District School Board, Sudbury Catholic District School Board, Conseil scolaire de district du Grand Nord de l'Ontario and Conseil scolaire de district catholique du Nouvel-Ontario.

The election was held in conjunction with those in other municipalities in the province of Ontario. For other elections, see 2022 Ontario municipal elections.

Nominations officially opened on May 2, 2022.

In March 2022, the city updated its election regulations to provide better clarification of the limits on the use of municipal resources in political campaigns.

Mayor
Incumbent mayor Brian Bigger stated that he intended to run for reelection, and registered as a candidate; however, in early October he dropped out of the race, citing the need to spend more time with his family in light of his mother's declining health. Due to the late timing of his departure, however, his name still appeared on the ballot.

Former federal Member of Parliament Paul Lefebvre, former Ward 4 councillor Evelyn Dutrisac, anti-poverty activist Bob Johnston, Miranda Rocca-Circelli, Don Gravelle, and Devin Labranche have registered to run for election.

Johnston's announcement was greeted with some controversy as he immediately placed a decal with the slogan "Not Bigger, but Better / Mayor / Vote Bob Johnston 2022" on his car within days of his initial announcement, potentially violating provincial election laws stating that candidates cannot incur any election-related expenses prior to the official opening of nominations on May 2.

Rocca-Circelli was accused by some of being a supporter of the "Freedom Convoy", claims which she denies.

City Council

Ward 1

Ward 2

Ward 3

Ward 4

Ward 5

Ward 6

Ward 7

Ward 8

Ward 9

Ward 10

Ward 11

Ward 12

References

External links

2022 Ontario municipal elections
2022